Mate Dujilo (born 16 October 1982) is a Croatian retired footballer who playied for Alta IF in Adeccoligaen in Norway.

Club career
He joined Alta IF  after a short spell with Finnish Veikkausliiga club MyPa.

Dujilo signed with Icelandic side Víkingur Ólafsvík in May 2013.

References

External links
Guardian Football

1982 births
Living people
Association football defenders
Croatian footballers
NK Novalja players
NK Zadar players
IFK Mariehamn players
Myllykosken Pallo −47 players
Alta IF players
Ungmennafélagið Víkingur players
Croatian Football League players
First Football League (Croatia) players
Norwegian First Division players
Veikkausliiga players
Croatian expatriate footballers
Expatriate footballers in Finland
Croatian expatriate sportspeople in Finland
Expatriate footballers in Norway
Croatian expatriate sportspeople in Norway
Expatriate footballers in Iceland
Croatian expatriate sportspeople in Iceland